Ridiculousness is an American comedy clip show that began airing on August 29, 2011 on MTV. It is hosted by Rob Dyrdek  and co-hosted by Sterling "Steelo" Brim and Chanel West Coast. Ridiculousness strictly showcases various viral videos from the Internet, usually involving failed do-it-yourself attempts at stunts, to which Dyrdek and his panelists add mockery and reaction. The producers of the series and MTV refuse any submitted videos for the show for the safety of their viewers, instead licensing already-existing content.

Production
On September 11, 2012, Ridiculousness was renewed for a twenty-episode third season. It premiered on February 14, 2013, and included a crossover with Jersey Shore when Pauly D guest-starred. The season took a hiatus from April 2013 to July 18, 2013. Season 3 averaged a 1.6 P12-34 rating and is the No.1 original cable series in its time slot with P12-34.

The series is produced by Superjacket Productions, Rob Dyrdek's production company, under a multi-year deal with MTV.

The theme song, a cover of Devo's "Uncontrollable Urge", was done along with Devo member Mark Mothersbaugh, with Dyrdek providing the "yeah"s. Music supervisor Ben Hochstein said that "Kids think the song is original to our show and have never heard of Devo, but hopefully, their parents appreciate the connection."

Due to the series being consistently marathoned on MTV and MTV2, beginning in October 2015, some episodes of Ridiculousness were repackaged with lower-cost production music. The new music was under blanket licenses overlaying the former tracks. The former tracks would have required MTV to pay music licensing fees to artists.

Reception
In 2016, a New York Times study of the 50 TV shows with the most Facebook Likes found that Ridiculousness "is most popular in rural Alaska, New Mexico and Montana, and least popular in Washington D.C., Atlanta and San Francisco".

Scheduling
By 2020, many journalists and media commentators noted that the series frequently occupied a great majority of MTV's programming lineup. In September 2020, John Gonzalez of The Ringer observed that the network often schedules marathon repeats of Ridiculousness which span multiple days, including one 36-hour period in August 2020 when MTV broadcast nothing else except episodes of the show. He speculated the show's success could be attributed to its "lowbrow content" and "familiar and formulaic" structure.

That same year, Michael Schneider and Kate Aurthur of Variety reported that reruns of Ridiculousness were broadcast for 113 of 168 total hours (67.3%) during one week in June 2020. They attributed its ubiquity to media companies, such as ViacomCBS, prioritizing streaming content at the expense of their linear television networks. In response, MTV released a statement saying that the television network was "just a single sliver" of their overall operations, and that an array programming was being developed for other mediums, and Tanya Giles, a ViacomCBS executive, said that the show was prioritized on the schedule as "escapist" entertainment with wide appeal for viewers at home during the COVID-19 pandemic. Contrary to that statement, as of May 2022, its repeats continue to make up a majority of the network's weekly schedule, with an unofficial Twitter account compiling the network's schedule showing the extent of MTV's dependence on the series to fill its broadcast week.

In November 2020, Adam Buckman of MediaPost also wrote about the show's prominence on MTV, and reached similar conclusions to its cause as Schneider and Aurthur. Buckman called it "an abuse of the end-user that today's low-rent cable TV channels presumably wish to reach -- i.e., cable subscribers at home who pay steep fees every month for dozens of name-brand cable channels that seem to have abandoned the idea of developing and producing original, attractive content worth paying for."

Spin-offs

Amazingness

MTV premiered Amazingness on December 8, 2017 and ended on January 19, 2018. Presented by Rob Dyrdek, every episode features six contestants showcasing their unique talents. After each performance, the judges decide who moves on and who is eliminated. The last performer standing is awarded $10,000.

Deliciousness

MTV greenlit Deliciousness on November 23, 2020 and the series later premiered on December 14, 2020, the series is hosted by Tiffani Thiessen, focusing on food blunders to restaurant fails to kids in the kitchen and more.

Adorableness

On June 21, 2021, MTV greenlit Adorableness, hosted by James Davis, which premiered on July 19, 2021.

Messyness

On June 4, 2021, MTV greenlit, Messyness, hosted by Nicole "Snooki" Polizzi, with Tori Spelling, Adam Rippon and Teddy Ray. The series premiered on August 23, 2021.

International versions

References

External links
 
 

2011 American television series debuts
2010s American comedy television series
2020s American comedy television series
2010s American video clip television series
2020s American video clip television series
MTV original programming
Television series by Dickhouse Productions
Mass media about Internet culture
Television series about social media
Internet memes
English-language television shows